Sarinh or Sarih may refer to:

Sarinh, Jalandhar, a village in Jalandhar district, Punjab
Sarinh, Ludhiana, a village in Ludhiana district, Punjab
Buttar Sarinh, a village in Sri Muktsar Sahib district